Minuscule 285 (in the Gregory-Aland numbering), ε 527 (Soden), is a Greek minuscule manuscript of the New Testament, on parchment. Paleographically it has been assigned to the 15th century. 
It has marginalia.

Description 

The codex contains a complete text of the four Gospels on 246 parchment leaves. The text is written in one column per page, in 22 lines per page.

Text 

The Greek text of the codex is a representative of the Byzantine text-type. Hermann von Soden classified it to the textual family Kr. Aland placed it in Category V.
According to the Claremont Profile Method it represents to the textual family Kr in Luke 1 and Luke 20. In Luke 10 no profile was made. It is weak member of textual cluster 20.

The text of the Pericope Adulterae (John 7:53-8:11) is marked by an obelus.

History 

The manuscript once belonged to Teller's. It was presented by Augustin Justinian to Giovanni Maria Catanaeo from Navara († 1529). It was used by Kuster's, who designated it as Paris 1. 
It was added to the list of New Testament manuscripts by Scholz (1794-1852). 
It was examined by Wettstein, Griesbach, Scholz, and Gregory (1885). It was examined and described by Paulin Martin. C. R. Gregory saw the manuscript in 1885.

The manuscript is currently housed at the Bibliothèque nationale de France (Gr. 95) at Paris.

See also 

 List of New Testament minuscules
 Biblical manuscript
 Textual criticism

References

Further reading 

 Jean-Pierre-Paul Martin, Description technique des manuscrits grecs, relatif au Nouveau Testament, conservé dans les bibliothèques des Paris (Paris 1883), p. 70.

Greek New Testament minuscules
15th-century biblical manuscripts
Bibliothèque nationale de France collections